Rocles is the name of several communes in France:

 Rocles, in the Allier department
 Rocles, in the Ardèche department
 Rocles, in the Lozère department